Equiinet is a privately held company based in Las Vegas, Nevada. The company is the manufacturer of voice and security appliances and provides telecommunications, cloud services, and VoIP services.

The company has offices in Bristol, United Kingdom and Beijing, China. Equiinet Limited was a former subsidiary of DICA Technologies AG. A business uses PBX technology to manage phone tasks such as call routing, allowing more than one person to be reached from a single number, voicemail, faxing, automated greetings, conference calling, and sending phone calls to the first available person in a department.

History
The company was founded in London in 1998 by a former Mitel employee Jonas—whom the company credits with coining the term UTM. Current Chairman Dominic Marrocco purchased the company in 2002 and in 2014, company headquarters were moved to Las Vegas, Nevada. 

Leith Martin, President of the company is also the Director for the Center of Entrepreneurship at the University of Nevada, Las Vegas.

On the technology front, the company released its VoIP feature in 2012 Equiinet takes cloud services from data center provider Switch in Las Vegas, NV.

Products and services
The company is the manufacturer of voice and security appliances and provides telecommunications, cloud services, and VoIP services. Equiinet UTM, formerly SentryPilot, is a Linux-based security appliance that provides antivirus, anti-spam and URL filtering tools.

Equiinet manufactures and markets server appliances for armed forces, SME businesses, and schools. The company provides converged voice and data products and services for the network security industry. It offers Tina, a single box product that delivers telephony services. The company also provides VoIP, unified threat management, connectivity failover, caching, URL filtering, and other communication products and services. It serves customers through its partner channels and resellers in the United Kingdom, North America, the Far East, and internationally.

References 

Companies based in Las Vegas
Telecommunications companies of the United States